African Palliative Care Association (APCA) is a pan-African non-governmental organization (NGO) working to promote and support the integration of palliative care into health systems across Africa. APCA has appeared on the BBC World Service, The Guardian  and across regional and national African press advocating for better palliative care provision.

History 

APCA was founded in Cape Town in 2002 after 28 palliative care trainers from across Africa met together and discussed the need for regional cooperation. The group produced the Cape Town Declaration, which holds palliative care, pain and symptom control as a human right for every adult and child with life-limiting illnesses. APCA however was not formally founded until two years later in 2004.

Since then APCA has continued to state palliative care as a human right, working with Human Rights Watch and the Open Society Foundation, calling on governments to live up to their responsibilities.

Published material 

 A Palliative Care Handbook for Africa, available on the World Health Association's website 
 Beating Pain. A Pocket Guide to Pain Management in Africa, in cooperation with AID-STAR ONE 
 Palliative Care for Women living with HIV and Cervical Cancer, in cooperation with the Open Society Initiative for Southern Africa

APCA also provides the editorial oversight to the Africa edition of ehospice news, an online global palliative care news platform.

Notable staff 

Dr. Emmanuel Luyirika is the current executive director of APCA. He took up this position in August 2012. Before moving to APCA, Dr. Luyirika worked as clinical director, centre director and ultimately country director for Mildmay International in Uganda.

Dr. Faith Mwangi-Powell was the founding director of APCA and held that position until 2012. Since then went to  become the senior program officer for global advocacy with the International Palliative Care Initiative of the Open Society Foundations and currently serves as the Chief Executive Officer for Girls Not Brides; The Global Partnership to end Child Marriage. Dr. Faith holds a Ph.D. in women's health and development and has published over 20 peer reviewed papers.

See also
Palliative sedation
Worldwide Hospice and Palliative Care Alliance

References 

Medical and health organisations based in South Africa
Palliative care